Leptotes pauloensis is a species of orchid endemic to São Paulo.

References

External links 

pauloensis
Endemic orchids of Brazil
Orchids of São Paulo (state)